The North Coast Mail was an Australian passenger train that ran from Sydney via the North Coast line to Grafton until October 1985.

It ran to Murwillumbah until April 1973 when replaced by the Gold Coast Motorail north of Grafton. It was the last New South Wales train to convey a travelling post office, this ceasing in August 1985.

References

Named passenger trains of New South Wales
Night trains of Australia
Passenger rail transport in New South Wales
Railway services discontinued in 1985
1985 disestablishments in Australia
Discontinued railway services in Australia